Lee County Airport  is a public use airport in Lee County, Virginia, United States. It is owned by Lee County and located five nautical miles (6 mi, 9 km) southwest of the central business district of Jonesville, Virginia. This airport is included in the National Plan of Integrated Airport Systems for 2011–2015, which categorized it as a general aviation facility.

Facilities and aircraft 
Lee County Airport covers an area of 328 acres (133 ha) at an elevation of 1,411 feet (430 m) above mean sea level. It has one runway designated 7/25 with an asphalt surface measuring 5,000 by 75 feet (1,524 x 23 m).

For the 12-month period ending May 31, 2012, the airport had 5,896 general aviation aircraft operations, an average of 16 per day. At that time there were 8 aircraft based at this airport: 75% single-engine, 12.5% jet, and 12.5% helicopter.

See also 
 List of airports in Virginia

References

External links 
 Airport page at Lee County website
 

Airports in Virginia
Transportation in Lee County, Virginia
Buildings and structures in Lee County, Virginia